Complete results for Women's Super-G competition at the 2009 World Championships.  It was run on February 3, the first race of the championships.

References
 FIS-ski.com - official results
 Ski Racing.com - Worlds: Vonn claims gold in super G - 03-Feb-2009

Women's super-G
2009 in French women's sport
FIS